The women's 800 metre freestyle event at the 2018 Commonwealth Games took place on 8 and 9 April at the Gold Coast Aquatic Centre.

Records
Prior to this competition, the existing world, Commonwealth and Games records were as follows:

Schedule
The schedule is as follows:

All times are Australian Eastern Standard Time (UTC+10)

Results

Heats

Final

References

Women's 800 metre freestyle
Commonwealth Games
Common